Composed in 1957, Symphonic Songs for Band is one of Robert Russell Bennett's most famous compositions for wind band. The work was commissioned for the National Intercollegiate Band by Kappa Kappa Psi and Tau Beta Sigma, national honorary band fraternity and sorority, as part of the two organizations' commissioning program. Since its premiere, it has become among the most frequently performed works in the wind band repertoire. It is considered to be a cornerstone of the band literature.

Symphonic Songs is a suite of three movements: Serenade, Spiritual, and Celebration. It was premiered in the Salt Lake Tabernacle in Salt Lake City on August 24, 1957, by the National Intercollegiate Band under the direction of Lieutenant Colonel William F. Santelmann, retired director of the United States Marine Band. The band comprised 112 musicians from Utah, Florida, Maryland, Colorado, Ohio, Texas, Indiana, and New Mexico.

Instrumentation 

Symphonic Songs is scored for piccolo, flutes 1-2, oboe 1, oboe 2 (dbl. Eng. horn), bassoons 1-2, E clarinet, Solo-1st-2nd-3rd B clarinets, E alto clarinet, B bass clarinet, E alto saxophones 1-2, B tenor saxophone, E baritone saxophone, B trumpets 1-2, Solo-1st-2nd-3rd B cornets, F horns 1-2-3-4, trombones 1-2-3, euphonium, tuba, string bass, drums, and timpani.

Structure

I. Serenade 

The work opens in 3/8 with a strong hemiola that gives the listener the impression that the work is in 3/4, with two written 3/8 measures to each perceived 3/4 measure. The hemiola abates somewhat when the main melody begins, but is present until the end of the movement. Clarinet, euphonium, trumpet, and trombone are all featured in solos.

II. Spiritual 

The Spiritual is in A–B–A form with a blues-inspired background over which the euphonium, cornet, horn choir, 
English horn, flute, and piccolo solo. The movement ends with a split-third chord, resulting in a simultaneous major and minor tonality.

III. Celebration 

The work ends with a bright celebration reminiscent of a country fair. Instruments evoke the sounds of the calliope and birdsong, and woodwinds act as the "cheering throngs" at a mule race. The movement ends with a "final thrust of full forces on a suspended high chord" with a "stinger" at the end.

See also 
 List of concert band literature
 List of works commissioned by Kappa Kappa Psi or Tau Beta Sigma

References 

Compositions by Robert Russell Bennett
Concert band pieces
1957 compositions
Kappa Kappa Psi
Tau Beta Sigma